Məşrif (also, Meshrif and Meşrif) is a village and municipality in the Siazan Rayon of Azerbaijan.  It has a population of 1,192.  The municipality consists of the villages of Məşrif, Qalaaltı, Daşlı Çalğan, Qərəh, and Orta Çalğan.

References 

Populated places in Siyazan District